Tsavo East National Park is one of the oldest and largest parks in Kenya at 13,747 square kilometres. Situated in a semi-arid area previously known as the Taru Desert it opened in April 1948, and is located near the town of Voi in the Taita-Taveta County of the former Coast Province. The park is divided into east and west sections by the A109 road and a railway. Named for the Tsavo River, which flows west to east through the national park, it borders the Chyulu Hills National Park, and the Mkomazi Game Reserve in Tanzania.

Geography
Inside Tsavo East National Park, the Athi and Tsavo rivers converge to form the Galana River. Most of the park consists of semi-arid grasslands and savanna. It is considered one of the world's biodiversity strongholds, and its popularity is mostly due to the vast amounts of diverse wildlife that can be seen, including the famous 'big five' consisting of lion, black rhino, cape buffalo, elephant and leopard. The park is also home to a great variety of bird life such as the black kite, crowned crane, lovebird and the sacred ibis.
Tsavo East National Park is generally flat, with dry plains across which the Galana River flows. Other features include the Yatta Plateau and Lugard Falls.

Tsavo West National Park is more mountainous and wetter, with swamps, Lake Jipe and the Mzima Springs. It is known for birdlife and for its large mammals. It is also home to a black rhino sanctuary.

Archaeology and history
Although a few Early Stone Age and Middle Stone Age archaeological sites are recorded from ground surface finds in Tsavo, there is much evidence for thriving Late Stone Age economy from 6,000 to 1,300 years ago. Research has shown that Late Stone Age archaeological sites are found close to the Galana River in high numbers. The inhabitants of these sites hunted wild animals, fished and kept domesticated animals. Because of the sparse availability of water away from the Galana River, human settlement in Tsavo focused on the riparian areas and in rock shelters as one moves west.

Swahili merchants traded with the inhabitants of Tsavo for ivory, catskins, and probably slaves as early as 700 AD (and probably earlier). There is no evidence for direct Swahili "colonization" of Tsavo. Instead, trade was probably accomplished by moving goods to and from the Swahili Coast via extended kin-networks. Trade goods such as cowry shells and beads have been recovered from archaeological sites dating to the early Swahili period.

19th century British and German explorers document people we now refer to as Orma and Watha during their travels through the "nyika" ("bush" or "hinterland") and generally viewed them as hostile toward their interests. Beginning in the late 19th/early 20th century, the British began a concerted effort to colonise the interior of Kenya and built a railway through Tsavo in 1898. Two "man-eating lions" terrorised the construction crews led by Lt. Col Patterson who eventually shot the pair not before they had killed one hundred and thirty five Indians and local workers. The railway was eventually completed through to Kisumu on Lake Victoria.

Tsavo remained the homeland for Orma pastoralists and Watha hunter-gatherers until 1948, when it was gazetted a national park. At that time, the Orma with their livestock were driven off and the aboriginal population of the Watha people was forcefully relocated to Voi and Mtito Andei as well as other locations within the nearby Taita Hills. Following Kenyan independence in 1963, hunting was banned in the park and management of Tsavo was turned over to the authority that eventually became the Kenya Wildlife Service. Tsavo currently attracts photo-tourists from all over the world interested in experiencing the vastness of the wilderness and incredible terrain.

Major attractions

Mudanda Rock

The Mudanda Rock is a 1.6 km inselberg of stratified rock that acts as a water catchment that supplies a natural dam below. It offers an excellent vantage point for the hundreds of elephants and other wildlife that come to drink during the dry season.

Yatta Plateau
The Yatta Plateau, the world's longest lava flow, runs along the western boundary of the park above the Athi River. Its 290 km length was formed by lava from Ol Doinyo Sabuk Mountain.

Lugard Falls
Lugard Falls, named after Frederick Lugard, is a series of white water rapids on the Galana River.

Aruba Dam
Aruba Dam was built in 1952 across the Voi River. The reservoir created by the dam attracts many animals and water birds.

Wildlife

Mammals
Tsavo East National Park is one of the world's largest game reserves, providing undeveloped wilderness homes to vast numbers of animals. Famous are the Tsavo lions, a population whose adult males often lack manes entirely. In total there are about 675 lions in the Amboseli-Tsavo ecosystem.

Some of the many mammals found in the park include:

 Aardwolf

 Yellow baboon

 Cape buffalo
 Senegal bushbaby
 Bushbuck
 Caracal
 African wildcat
 Southeast African cheetah
 African civet
 Kirk's dik-dik
 African wild dog
 African dormouse
 Blue duiker
 Bush duiker
 Harvey's red duiker
 Common eland
 African bush elephant
 Bat-eared fox
 Northern greater galago
 Grant's gazelle
 Rusty-spotted genet
 Common genet
 Gerenuk 
 Masai giraffe
 African savanna hare
 Springhare
 Coke's hartebeest
 Hunter's hartebeest
 East African hedgehog
 Spotted hyena
 Striped hyena
 Yellow-spotted rock hyrax
 Southern tree hyrax
 Impala
 Black-backed jackal
 Side-striped jackal
 Klipspringer
 Lesser kudu
 Leopard
 Lion
 Banded mongoose
 Dwarf mongoose
 Egyptian mongoose
 Marsh mongoose
 Slender mongoose
 White-tailed mongoose
 Vervet monkey
 Sykes' monkey
 Fringe-eared oryx
 Clawless otter
 Ground pangolin
 Crested porcupine
 Cane rat
 Giant rat
 Naked mole rat
 Honey badger
 Bohor reedbuck
 Black rhinoceros
 Serval
 Elephant shrew
 Bush squirrel
 African red squirrel
 Striped ground squirrel
 Unstriped ground squirrel
 Suni
 Common warthog
 Ellipsen waterbuck
 Plains zebra
 Grevy's zebra.

Birds
Over 500 bird species have been recorded in the area, including ostriches, kestrels, buzzards, starlings, weaver birds, kingfishers, hornbills, secretary birds and herons.

Poaching 
Between 2001 and 2006 more than 100 lions, elephants & other exotic wildlife have been killed in the Amboseli-Tsavo ecosystem. Most of them have been speared by young men. The poachers usually do not face serious consequences. In contrast, the game scouts who arrested offenders have been punished by the community.

References 

 Kusimba, Chapurukha M.; Kusimba, Sibel B.; Wright, David K. (2005) The development and collapse of precolonial ethnic mosaics in Tsavo, Kenya. Journal of African Archaeology 3(2):345–365. JAfrArch
 Thorbahn, P. F., (1979) The Precolonial Ivory Trade of East Africa: Reconstruction of a Human-Elephant Ecosystem. Ph.D., University of Massachusetts, Amherst.
 Wijngaarden, W. v., and V. W. P. v. Engelen (1985) Soils and Vegetation of the Tsavo Area. Geological Survey of Kenya, Nairobi.
 Wright, David K. (2005) Environment, Chronology and Resource Exploitation of the Pastoral Neolithic in Tsavo, Kenya. PhD Dissertation, Department of Anthropology, University of Illinois at Chicago. Wright Diss
 Wright, David K. (2005) New perspectives on early regional interaction networks in East Africa: A view from Tsavo National Park, Kenya. African Archaeological Review 15(3):111–141. AAR
 Wright, David K. (2007) Tethered mobility and riparian resource exploitation among Neolithic hunters and herders in the Galana River Basin, Kenyan Coastal Lowlands. Environmental Archaeology 12(1):25–47. Env. Archaeology
 Wright, David K.; Forman, Steven L.; Kusimba, Chapurukha M.; Pierson, James; Gomez, Jeanette; Tattersfield, Peter (2007) Stratigraphic and geochronological context of human habitation along the Galana River, Kenya. Geoarchaeology 22(7):709–730. Geoarch
 Patterson, John Henry. (1907) Man-Eaters of Tsavo. P 41 – 114.

External links

 http://www.tsavonationalpark.co.ke/tsavo-east-national-park-kenya-accommodation-safari-lodges-camps-hotels.html
 The Watha People 
 Kenya Wildlife Service page for Tsavo East National Park
  World Database on Protected Areas: Tsavo East National Park

National parks of Kenya
Athi-Galana-Sabaki River
Protected areas established in 1948
Tsavo National Park
Northern Acacia-Commiphora bushlands and thickets